Portugal competed at the 2014 Winter Olympics in Sochi, Russia, from 7 to 23 February 2014. It was the country's seventh overall and third consecutive participation at the Olympic Winter Games. The team consisted of two alpine skiers, Arthur Hanse and Camille Dias, which competed in the slalom events.

Competitors

Alpine skiing 

According to the quota allocation released on January 20, 2014, Portugal had two athletes in qualification position. This will be the first time Portugal competes in alpine skiing since the 1994 Winter Olympics.

References

External links 
Portugal at the 2014 Winter Olympics

Nations at the 2014 Winter Olympics
2014
2014 in Portuguese sport